The 2011 European Judo Championships were held at the Abdi İpekçi Arena in Istanbul, Turkey, from 21 to 24 April 2011.

Medal overview

Men

Women

Medal table

Results overview

Men

–60 kg

–66 kg

–73 kg

–81 kg

–90 kg

–100 kg

+100 kg

Teams

Women

–48 kg

–52 kg

–57 kg

–63 kg

–70 kg

–78 kg

+78 kg

Teams

References

External links
 Official website
 
 Results
 Team results

 
European Judo Championships
E
European Judo Championships
Sports competitions in Istanbul
European
European
2011 in Istanbul
European Judo Championships